Peshrar is a village in the Peshrar CD block in the Lohardaga Sadar subdivision of the Lohardaga district in the Indian state of Jharkhand.

Geography

Location                                  
Peshrar is located at

Area overview 
The map alongside shows an undulating plateau area with the hilly tract in the west and north-west. Three Bauxite mining centres are marked. It is an overwhelmingly rural district with 87.6% of the population living in the rural areas.

Note: The map alongside presents some of the notable locations in the district. All places marked in the map are linked in the larger full screen map.

Civic administration

Police station 
There is a police station at Peshrar.

CD block HQ 
The headquarters of Peshrar CD block are located at Peshrar village.

Demographics 
According to the 2011 Census of India, Pesrar had a total population of 1,308, of which 693 (53%) were males and 615 (47%) were females. Population in the age range 0–6 years was 289. The total number of literate persons in Pesrar was 500 (49.07% of the population over 6 years).

(*For language details see Peshrar block#Language and religion)

Education
Middle School Peshrar is a Hindi-medium coeducational institution established in 2003. It has facilities for teaching from class I to class VIII.

Project High School Mungo is a Hindi-medium coeducational institution established in 1981. It has facilities for teaching from class VI to class X.

References 

Villages in Lohardaga district